Giulio Raibolini (1487–1540) also called Giulio Francia was an Italian painter of the Renaissance. He was the younger son and pupil of Francesco Raibolini. He worked jointly with his brother Giacomo on paintings.

References

1487 births
1540 deaths
15th-century Italian painters
Italian male painters
16th-century Italian painters
Italian Renaissance painters